The 1983 World Fencing Championships were held in Vienna, Austria. The event took place from July 20 to July 30, 1983.

Medal table

Medal summary

Men's events

Women's events

References

FIE Results

World Fencing Championships
1983 in Austria
1980s in Vienna
Sports competitions in Vienna
International fencing competitions hosted by Austria
1983 in fencing
July 1983 sports events in Europe